"The Death of King Edgar" is an Old English poem commemorating the death of the English King Edgar, nicknamed "the Peaceful". The poem, a "song of mourning", is found in two of the manuscripts of the Anglo-Saxon Chronicle.

Sources
Two of the manuscripts of the Anglo-Saxon Chronicle contain the poem, in the annal for the year 975: the [D] manuscript (also known as "The Worcester Chronicle") and the [E] manuscript, also known as the "Peterborough Chronicle".

Content and style
The 37-line poem reads like a series of disasters that will befall the English people after the death of the king. According to Lois Bragg, it is divisible into six sections, the last four of which share the theme of disaster:
 ll. 1-2, the death of King Edgar
 ll. 13-15, the death of bishop Cyneweard of Glastonbury
 ll. 16-23, the "breaking up of the monasteries"
 ll. 24-28, the expulsion of an invader named Olsac
 ll. 29-33a, a comet appears
 ll. 33b-37, a famine.

While the eighteenth-century historian Samuel Henry already noticed the poem, it is not generally praised for its beauty, and one nineteenth-century critic commented that "it exhibits the muse in the homeliest garb; nor does it contain sufficient of nature or feeling to redeem its rugged barbarity." For historians, the poem evidences an ongoing interest in historical writing in this period.

References

Notes

Bibliography

External links
 "The Second Death of Edgar" (975) is edited, annotated and linked to digital images of its manuscript pages, with translation, in the Old English Poetry in Facsimile Project: https://oepoetryfacsimile.org

Old English poems
Bodleian Library collection
British Library collections
Works of unknown authorship